Silverbird may refer to:

Music
Silverbird (album), a 1973 album by Leo Sayer
Silverbird, a 1970 album by Mark Lindsay
"Silver Bird" (Mark Lindsay song), a 1969 song by Mark Lindsay from the album Arizona
"Silver Bird" (Tina Rainford song)

Science and technology
Silverbird (bird), a passerine bird native to eastern Africa
Silverbird (aircraft), a rocket-powered aircraft design
Silverbird (software), a former software label owned by Telecomsoft

Other
The Silverbird Group, a Nigerian multinational conglomerate
Silverbird Hotel, a Las Vegas hotel